Michael Hames was a Detective Superintendent in the Metropolitan Police, head of the Obscene Publications Branch from 1990 until his retirement in 1994, including being involved in Operation Spanner.

He appeared in several television programmes, including the Dispatches episode "Beyond Belief" in 1992, the Brass Eye episode "Paedogeddon" in 2001, The Dark Side of Porn episode "Does Snuff Exist?" in 2006 and “Jimmy Savile a British horror story” on Netflix.

References

External links

Metropolitan Police officers
Living people
Year of birth missing (living people)